Tauondi Aboriginal College, also known as Tauondi Aboriginal Community College, is a non-profit independent Australian Aboriginal college in Port Adelaide, South Australia, founded in 1973. Their name was used to honor the traditional owners of the Adelaide Plains, the Kaurna people. In Kaurna, tauondi means to "penetrate and break through”.

In 1966, this college, along with four others, founded the Federation of Independent Aboriginal Education Providers.

Taudoni Aboriginal College provides adult education for Aboriginal and Torres Strait Islander people, with the aim of "upholding Aboriginal cultures and identities in ways that respect Aboriginal lore and custom and the diversity of students’ experiences and ambitions".

It teaches Aboriginal languages, including Kaurna and Ngarrindjeri. In 2021 the first students of the first training course to be specially tailored to the teaching of Aboriginal languages graduated, and are now able to pass on their skills to the community.

References

Indigenous Australian education
Education in Adelaide